Harewali is a village located at Bijnor district of Uttar Pradesh.

Geographical location
 
It is 5.9 km N of Sherkot, 8.6 km W of Afzalgarh, 12.1 km NE of Dhampur, 15.0 km ESE of Nagina. It is located near to Uttar Pradesh and Uttarakhand Border. There are lot of beautiful natural places around this village to see like rivers, forest, and hills. Harewali has 1st Barrage (Chhota Bandh) of Ramganga Pariyojna approved at Kalagarh which has 25 gates for Ramganga River and 5 gates for KHO river passed through Sherkot.

Villages in Bijnor district